Prince Dimitri Aleksandrovich Jorjadze (26 October 189826 October 1985) was a Georgian nobleman, Ambassador Hotel executive, and race car driver.

Biography
Dimitri (Mito) Jorjadze was born in the country of Georgia, Kakheti, to Alexander Jorjadze, a Georgian noble man, officer, diplomat and a winemaker, and his half Ukrainian-half Georgian wife - Domenica Naumenko. Dimitri was a member of the Georgian nobility of Tbilisi from the Jorjadze family, who became exiled after the overthrow of Tsarist Russia and the subsequent Bolshevik takeover.

The 6'3" prince was probably best known in racing circles. In early July 1931, he won the Touring Car Grand Prix, 24 Hours of Spa, in Belgium. He covered the greatest distance, 1,580.7 miles at a speed of 65.8 miles per hour, in a Mercedes-Benz SSK with Goffredo Zehender.

Boone Hall
In June 1940, he bought the historic South Carolina plantation known as Boone Hall, eight miles from Charleston, South Carolina in the U.S., from Thomas A. Stone of Canada. He raced Thoroughbreds under the nom de course, Boone Hall Stable. Most notable of his horses was Princequillo, which in 1943, was the fastest distance runner in the United States and which became a two-time Leading sire in North America and a seven-time Leading broodmare sire in North America.

Jorjadze was associated with Prince Serge Obolensky in the hotel business in New York City.

Private life
He was married twice. His first wife was Audrey Emery, the American-born former wife of Grand Duke Dmitri Pavlovich of Russia; he married her in March 1937 in Maidstone, England. The marriage ended in divorce. He married for a second time in 1954 to Sylvia Ashley, a one-time English showgirl who had been married to Major Lord Anthony Ashley-Cooper, Clark Gable, and Douglas Fairbanks, Sr.

See also 
 Jorjadze, Georgian surname
 Gael Elton Mayo, The Man in a Panther Skin: the Life of Prince Dimitri Djordjadze (1985);(Estate of Gael Elton Mayo c/o BookBlast, London) .

References

External links
Motor Races 1931 - Belgian 24-Hours-Race
Republic of Georgia
 Princes of the Russian Empire 
Europe Royalty : Russia

1898 births
1985 deaths
Nobility of Georgia (country)
20th-century people from Georgia (country)
Georgian racing drivers
Russian racing drivers
24 Hours of Spa drivers
American racehorse owners and breeders
White Russian emigrants to the United States
American people of Georgian (country) descent